Cork Mid, North, South, South East and West was a parliamentary constituency represented in Dáil Éireann, the lower house of the Irish parliament or Oireachtas from 1921 to 1923. The constituency elected 8 deputies (Teachtaí Dála, commonly known as TDs) to the Dáil, on the system of proportional representation by means of the single transferable vote (PR-STV).

History and boundaries
The constituency was created in 1921 as an 8-seat constituency, under the Government of Ireland Act 1920, for the 1921 general election to the House of Commons of Southern Ireland, whose members formed the 2nd Dáil. It succeeded the constituencies of Cork Mid, Cork North, Cork South, Cork South East and Cork West which were used to elect the Members of the 1st Dáil and earlier UK House of Commons members.

The constituency covered most of County Cork except for Cork city and the northern eastern and eastern parts of the county.

It was abolished under the Electoral Act 1923, when it was replaced by the new Cork North and Cork West constituencies, which were first used in the 1923 general election for the Members of the 4th Dáil.

TDs 

The constituency's most notable TD was Michael Collins, who was Minister for Finance in the First Dáil of 1919, Director of Intelligence for the IRA, and member of the Irish delegation during the Anglo-Irish Treaty negotiations. He was killed during the Civil War in an ambush on 22 August 1922 near the village of Béal na Bláth.

Elections

1922 general election 
In Cork Mid, North, South, South East and West, Sinn Féin's eight candidates (all outgoing TDs from the 2nd Dáil) were joined by two from the Labour Party and two from the Farmers' Party.  Pro-Treaty Sinn Féin candidates won a combined total of 45.75% of the first-preference votes, with their anti-Treaty counterparts winning a combined 23.03%.  Both Labour Party candidates were elected, along with one Farmers' Party candidate, unseating two anti-Treaty Sinn Féin TDs and one pro-Treaty TD.

1921 general election 
At the 1921 general election to the 2nd Dáil, no seats were contested in the 26 counties which became the Irish Free State. In Cork Mid, North, South, South East and West only eight candidates were nominated for the constituency's eight seats.  No ballot was needed, and all eight Sinn Féin candidates were elected unopposed after the close of nominations on 24 May 1921. The 8 TDs elected are listed here in alphabetical order:

|}

See also 
Dáil constituencies
Politics of the Republic of Ireland
Historic Dáil constituencies
Elections in the Republic of Ireland

References

External links 
Oireachtas Members Database

Dáil constituencies in the Republic of Ireland (historic)
Historic constituencies in County Cork
1921 establishments in Ireland
1923 disestablishments in Ireland
Constituencies established in 1921
Constituencies disestablished in 1923